El Ouata is a town and commune in Béchar Province, western Algeria. The commune is coextensive with El Ouata District, which is named after the town. According to the 2008 census its population is 7,343, up from 7,014 in 1998, with an annual population growth rate of 0.5%.

Geography
El Ouata lies on the left (northeast) bank of the Oued Saoura in the Saoura valley. The Grand Erg Occidental, a large area of continuous sand dunes lies to the east, while the rocky ridges of the Ougarta Range rise to the west, running from northwest to southeast along the opposite side of the river from the town.

Climate

El Ouata has a hot desert climate, with extremely hot summers and warm winters, and very little precipitation throughout the year.

<div style="width:75%;">

Economy

Agriculture is the main industry in El Ouata. There are a total of 136,180 date palms planted in the commune. As of 2009 there were 1,009 sheep, 1,140 goats, 1,011 camels, and 8 cattle.

Tourism in El Ouata is mainly focused around the sand dunes, palm groves, the old ksar, and the nearby Ougarta Range.

Infrastructure and housing

85% of El Ouata's population are connected to drinking water (the second lowest rate in the province), but 100% are connected to the sewerage system, and 81% (including 2,527 buildings) have access to electricity (the equal lowest in the province). There is one fuel service station in the town.

El Ouata has a total of 1,503 houses, of which 905 are occupied, giving an occupation rate of 8.1 inhabitants per occupied building.

Transportation
El Ouata is on the N6 national highway between Béchar to the northwest and Adrar to the southeast. Towns accessible to the north via the N6 include Béni Abbès and Igli, while to the south the towns of Béni Ikhlef, Kerzaz, Timoudi and Ouled Khoudir can be accessed.

Education

There are 8 elementary schools, with 57 classrooms including 39 in use. There are a total of 2,243 school students.

5.6% of the population has a tertiary education, and another 15.3% has competed secondary education. The overall literacy rate is 74.2%, and is 84.5% among males and 64.5% among females.

Health

El Ouata has 2 polyclinics, 8 room care facilities, and a maternity ward.

Religion

El Ouata has 11 operational mosques, with another 1 under construction.

Localities
The commune is composed of 10 localities:

El Ouata Centre
Ksar Bouhadid
Ksir El Ma
Ammas
El Madja
Annefid
Aguedal
El Bayada
Boukhlouf
El Ouata Ksar

References

Neighbouring towns and cities

Communes of Béchar Province
Béchar Province